Croatian war crimes may refer to:

 Croatian war crimes in World War II (1939 – 1945)
 Croatian war crimes in the Yugoslav Wars (1991 – 1995)